Huari is a small town in the Ancash Region in central Peru. It is the seat of the Huari Province. It lies on the eastern slope of the Andean mountain range known as the Cordillera Blanca. The economy of the providence is primarily agricultural, and at least half the population are engaged in subsistence horticulture, raising potatoes, sweet potatoes, other native tubers, quinoa, maize, wheat, barley, tomatoes, peppers, and some other vegetables. Many residential households also raise a few animals, including goats, sheep, pigs, occasionally cattle, guinea pigs (cuy), rabbits, chickens, and ducks. Much of the trade in this rural area is barter.

Huari is connected to the electric grid, and in 2005 some of the surrounding villages were just beginning to be connected to the grid.

History

Huari in the year 1965
In the mid-1960s electricity was locally generated by a small hydroelectric plant. The plant supplied AC power from dusk to dawn; at dawn the natural-stream water was diverted back into the water pipes that supplied potable water until dusk. Electricity and running water was available to less than a hundred Huari businesses, government offices, private residences, and the public school; and for the Diocese of the (Roman Catholic) Bishop of Huari, and for less than two dozen streetlights.

Several streets—mostly no wider than four meters—were cobbled and maintained for vehicular traffic. There were no concrete or asphalted streets, although many streets had raised cobbled sidewalks.

The drive from Huari westward to the Pan-American Highway during fair weather required six to eight hours on packed-earth and graveled roads until arriving at the asphalt-paved Pan-American Highway on the Pacific coast near the town of Comas. Crossing the Cordillera Blanca was facilitated by a one-lane tunnel about 800 meters length.  This tunnel was a 5-meter cylindrical tube that had been blasted and cut through rock. The ceiling and walls were unfinished, and year-round the water seeps at numerous places kept the rough but generally level one-lane roadway constantly muddy and covered with puddles. Crossing this generally east-west highway about halfway between the Cordillera Blanca and the Cordillera Blanca is the north-south highway between the Ancash capital, Huaraz, and the large ancient town of Recuay. From Huari the city of Huaraz was a motor-vehicle trip of about four hours; the distance from Huari to Recuay was somewhat less.

Populated places in the Ancash Region